The 7th Arkansas Cavalry Regiment (1863–1865) was a Confederate Army cavalry regiment during the American Civil War.

Organization
This regiment was formed on July 25, 1863, by adding independent companies to J. F. Hill's Arkansas Cavalry Battalion.  The 7th Cavalry was commanded by Colonel John Fry Hill, Lieutenant Colonel Oliver Basham, and Majors J. L. Adams and J. C. Ward.  Many former members of the 10th Arkansas Militia Regiment joined this unit.  The unit was composed of companies from the following counties:

 Company A – Pope County
 Company B – Johnson County
 Company C – Searcy County
 Company D – Pope County
 Company F – Unknown
 Company G – Madison County
 Company H – Pope and Johnson County
 Company K – Johnson County
 Company L – Johnson County
 Company M – Johnson County

Battles
The unit served in General Cabell's Brigade, Trans-Mississippi Department, and fought in the following engagements:

 Battle of Devil's Backbone, Arkansas, September 1, 1863
 Battle of Poison Spring, Arkansas, April 18, 1864
 Battle of Marks' Mills, Arkansas, April 25, 1864
 Battle of Pine Bluff, Arkansas,
 Battle of Dardanelle, Arkansas,
 Price's Missouri Raid, Arkansas-Missouri-Kansas, September, 1864
 Battle of Marais des Cygnes, Linn County, Kansas, October 25, 1864

Surrender
This regiment surrendered at Galveston, Texas.

See also

 List of Arkansas Civil War Confederate units
 Lists of American Civil War Regiments by State
 Confederate Units by State
 Arkansas in the American Civil War
 Arkansas Militia in the Civil War

References

External links
  Edward G. Gerdes Civil War Home Page
 Encyclopedia of Arkansas History and Culture
 The War of the Rebellion: a Compilation of the Official Records of the Union and Confederate Armies
 The Arkansas History Commission, State Archives, Civil War in Arkansas

Units and formations of the Confederate States Army from Arkansas
1865 disestablishments in Arkansas
Military units and formations in Arkansas
Military units and formations established in 1863
Military units and formations disestablished in 1865
Military in Arkansas
1863 establishments in Arkansas